The 2022 Copa Colsanitas (branded as the 2022 Copa Colsanitas presentado por Zurich for sponsorship reasons) was a women's tennis tournament played on outdoor clay courts. It was the 24th edition of the tournament and part of the 250 category of the 2022 WTA Tour. It took place at the Country Club in Bogotá, Colombia, from 4 April to 10 April 2022.

Champions

Singles 

  Tatjana Maria def.  Laura Pigossi, 6–3, 4–6, 6–2.

This was Maria's second WTA Tour singles title, and first since 2018.

Doubles 

   Astra Sharma /  Aldila Sutjiadi def.  Emina Bektas /  Tara Moore, 4–6, 6–4, [11–9]

Points and prize money

Point distribution

Prize money 

*per team

Singles main-draw entrants

Seeds 

1 Rankings as of 21 March 2022.

Other entrants 
The following players received wildcards into the main draw:
  María Herazo González
  Yuliana Lizarazo
  Yuliana Monroy

The following players received entry from the qualifying draw:
  María Carlé
  Suzan Lamens
  Tatjana Maria
  İpek Öz
  Laura Pigossi
  Daniela Seguel

Withdrawals 
 Before the tournament
  Marie Bouzková → replaced by  Despina Papamichail
  Cristina Bucșa → replaced by  Lucrezia Stefanini
  Mai Hontama → replaced by  Sara Errani
  Nadia Podoroska → replaced by  Ylena In-Albon
  Wang Qiang → replaced by  Paula Ormaechea
 Retirement
  Ylena In-Albon

Doubles main draw entrants

Seeds 

1 Rankings as of March 21, 2022.

Other entrants 
The following pairs received a wildcard into the doubles main draw:
  Bárbara Gatica /  Rebeca Pereira
  María Herazo González /  Yuliana Lizarazo

References

External links 
 
 WTA tournament details

Copa Colsanitas
Copa Colsanitas
Copa Colsanitas
Copa Colsanitas